The Russian State Archive of Contemporary History (RGANI) is a large Russian state archive managed by Rosarkhiv, which preserves post-1952 documents of the Communist Party of the Soviet Union. It was established in 1999 as the successor to the Center for Preservation of Contemporary Documentation (TsKhSD), which acquired current records of the Communist Party nationalized after the failure of the Soviet coup attempt in 1991. A very large percentage of its files are still classified and many others are still difficult to access. In 1992 Soviet dissident Vladimir Bukovsky worked in the archive and secretly scanned copies of some documents. Pre-1952 documents of the CPSU are collected in the Russian State Archive of Socio-Political History.

References

External links

About RGANI (in English)

State archives
Archives in Russia